The Lords of Eppstein were a family of German nobility in the Middle Ages. From the 12th century they ruled extensive territories in the Rhine Main area from their castle in Eppstein, northwest of Frankfurt, Germany.

History

Between 1180 and 1190, the Archbishop of Mainz enfeoffed Eppstein Castle, along with neighboring district courts and villages to Gerhard III of Hainhausen. Gerhard changed his name to Eppstein and already having control of the present-day district of Offenbach, became the first in the line which was soon to become one of the most influential families in the Rhine Main area.

Four of the seven Archbishops of Mainz and Electoral Princes in the 13th century were of the house of Eppstein.  They raised the Electorate to considerable power and played a significant role in the politics of the Holy Roman Empire.  In the struggle between the Emperor and the Pope, Archbishop Siegfried III took sides with the anti-Staufer group which played an important part in the beginnings of German federalism.  The secular Eppsteiners, by purchase, marriage and enfeoffment, acquired extensive territories and rights between Middle Rhine to the Vogelsberg hills and between the Lahn River to the Odenwald.

The realm of the Lords of Eppstein was divided in 1433 between brothers Gottfried VII (Eppstein-Münzenberg) and Eberhard II (Eppstein-Königstein).  The last of these branches became extinct in 1535 and Eppstein was passed mostly to the Landgraves of Hesse and the Ecclesiastical Principality of Mainz.

See also
 Bad Homburg vor der Höhe

Further reading
 Walter Pietsch: Die Entwicklung des Territoriums der Herren von Eppstein im 12. und 13. Jahrhundert, vornehmlich aufgrund ihrer Lehensverzeichnisse. In: HJL. 12, 1962, S. 15–50.
 Regina Schäfer: Die Herren von Eppstein. Herrschaftsausübung, Verwaltung und Besitz eines Hochadelsgeschlechts im Spätmittelalter. Historische Kommission für Nassau, Wiesbaden 2000,  (Veröffentlichungen der Historischen Kommission für Nassau. Band 68).

References 

Lordships of the Holy Roman Empire
Taunus